Aldrovandia is a genus of ray-finned fish in the family Halosauridae. They occur in the Pacific, Atlantic, and Indian Oceans. They can reach  in total length.

Species
This genus currently contains the following recognized species:
 Aldrovandia affinis (Günther, 1877) (Gilbert's halosaur)
 Aldrovandia gracilis Goode & T. H. Bean, 1896 (gracile halosaur)
 Aldrovandia mediorostris (Günther, 1887) (Challenger halosaur)
 Aldrovandia oleosa Sulak, 1977 (Bahamas halosaur)
 Aldrovandia phalacra (Vaillant, 1888) (Hawaiian halosaur)
 Aldrovandia rostrata (Günther, 1878) (rostrate halosaur)

References 

Halosauridae
Marine fish genera
Ray-finned fish genera
Deep sea fish
Taxa named by George Brown Goode
Taxa named by Tarleton Hoffman Bean